Bramfeld is a quarter of Hamburg, Germany, in the borough of Wandsbek. It is located on the southeastern border of the borough, which lies in the northeastern part of the city. Bramfeld includes the former village of Hellbrook, but consists today out of residential as well as of commercial areas. Around 52,700 inhabitants live in the quarter.

Geography
Bramfeld borders the quarters of Sasel, Farmsen-Berne, Wandsbek, Barmbek-Nord, Steilshoop, Ohlsdorf and Wellingsbüttel. The lake of Bramfelder See is located at Bramfeld boundaries on Steilshoop territory. The streams of Seebek (former Grenzbach, lit. border stream) and Osterbek flow also at the boundaries of Bramfeld. The Seebek forms the border to Barmbek-Nord and Steilshoop, while the Osterbek marks the border to Wandsbek and Farmsen-Berne.

History
In 1271 Bramfeld was first recorded as a village. The name refers to genista, Ginster and also Brambusch in German, which characterized the landscape at that time. The bush is also in the blazon of Bramfeld. In the 15th century, the farming village of Bramfeld was home to only ten farmers. In the 17th century, Bramfeld remained in Holstein and gradually developed into an artisan and farming village near Hamburg. 
In 1913/14 the church of Osterkirche (Easter church) was built. Bramfeld was incorporated into Hamburg in 1937 with the Greater Hamburg Act. There are plans to build an underground line to the quarter.

Politics
These are the results of Bramfeld in the Hamburg state election:

References

External links

 Bramfeld, Hamburg.de

Quarters of Hamburg
Wandsbek